The Qatar women's national volleyball team represents Qatar in international women's volleyball competitions and friendly matches.

The team has finished as runners-up in the 2005 and 2007 editions of the 1st Women Games of the Capitals, Islamic and Asian Countries.

References

External links
 Qatar Volleyball Federation
Facebook presentation

National women's volleyball teams
Volleyball in Qatar
Volleyball